Anthony Lefroy may refer to:

 Anthony Lefroy (Irish politician) (1800–1890), Irish politician, Member of Parliament for Longford
 Anthony O'Grady Lefroy (1816–1897), government official in Western Australia